The Benue State House of Assembly is the legislative arm of the government of Benue State of Nigeria. It is a unicameral legislature with 17 members elected from the 23 local government areas of the state. Some local government areas are merged to form a single constituency. This makes the number of legislators in the Benue State House of Assembly 27.

The fundamental functions of the Assembly are to enact new laws, amend or repeal existing laws and oversight of the executive. Members of the assembly are elected for a term of four years concurrent with federal legislators (Senate and House of Representatives) and the governor of the state. The state assembly convenes three times a week (Tuesdays, Wednesdays and Thursdays) for plenary in the assembly complex within the state capital, Makurdi. Outside this period, committee and other oversight activities are conducted

The current leaders of the 9th Benue State House of Assembly are Titus Uba (speaker) and Christopher Adaji (deputy speaker).

References 

Politics of Benue State
State legislatures of Nigeria